Jan Archibald is a make-up artist. Her work in La Vie en Rose (2007) earned her the Academy Award for Best Makeup as well as a BAFTA Award for Best Makeup and Hair. She had previously won the latter award for her work in The Wings of the Dove (1997). She won the Primetime Emmy Award for Outstanding Hairstyling for a Miniseries or Special for her work on Poor Little Rich Girl: The Barbara Hutton Story.

References

External links

Make-up artists
Best Makeup Academy Award winners
Best Makeup BAFTA Award winners
Primetime Emmy Award winners
Year of birth missing (living people)
Living people
Place of birth missing (living people)